Eloyi, or Afu (Afo), is a Plateau language of uncertain classification. It is spoken by the Eloyi people of Agatu LGA and Otukpo LGA of Benue State and Nassarawa State in Nigeria.

Classification
Armstrong (1955, 1983) classified Eloyi as Idomoid, but that identification was based on a single word list and Armstrong later expressed doubts. All other preliminary accounts classify it as Plateau, and Blench (2008) leaves it as a separate branch of Plateau.

Blench (2007) considers Eloyi to be a divergent Plateau language that has undergone Idomoid influence, rather than vice versa.

References

Blench (2008) Prospecting proto-Plateau. Manuscript.

External links
ComparaLex, database with Eloyi word list

Plateau languages
Languages of Nigeria